The 1940–41 season was the second season of special wartime football in England during the Second World War.

Honours
League competition was split into two regional leagues, one North and one South. Teams played as many fixtures as was feasible, and winners were decided on goal average rather than points.

See also
England national football team results (unofficial matches)

References

 
Wartime seasons in English football